
Shelley is a village in the civil parish of Kirkburton in the county of West Yorkshire, England.

Community
Shelley had a population of 3,059 according to the 2001 census.
 The village is part of the Kirkburton ward of the local council. Road transport links are the A629 and B6116 roads.

Within the village is Shelley Hall, which dates to the 17th century, and is a Grade II* listed building.

Shelley has two places of worship. Shelley Methodist Church, off Far Bank at the west of the village, is a Grade II listed building dating to 1785–6, originally a Methodist New Connexion chapel. The Church of England's Gothic Revival Church of Emmanuel is on Huddersfield Road at the east of the village. The church, built in 1868, is a Grade II listed building. A United Reformed Church on Water Lane is today closed.

The village has three public houses, The Rising Sun, The Flying Ferret (formerly Oddfellows) and Shelley Sports and Social Club. The Emley Moor TV mast is northeast from the village.

The village has a community association which meets in its Village Hall. 

Shelley won the Calor Yorkshire and Northern Village of the Year award in 2004, following winning the earlier round for 'Yorkshire's small village of the year' promoted by the Yorkshire Rural Community Council.

Barncliffe Mill at Brookhouse, former home to Shelley Textiles, became the headquarters for Whitley Willows Ltd after the closure of the Lepton mill.

Education
Shelley has a primary school which teaches children from Reception to Year 5. Next to the school in a prefabricated building is a pre-school and out-of-school club.

Shelley College is within the parish at the east and at the border with the parish of Denby Dale. It teaches pupils who live in both the Kirkburton and Denby Dale wards with pupils mainly from the neighbouring middle schools at Kirkburton and Scissett. It was originally Shelley High School, changing to Shelley College when it attained specialist status in science. The actress Lena Headey attended Shelley College.

Sport
 Shelley also has a community football club, based at Storthes Hall Park the first team were semi professional for 2 seasons, competing in the North West Counties Football League until their withdrawal for the 2020–21 season.

See also
Listed buildings in Kirkburton

References

External links 

Shelley Community Association website
Shelley College website

 
Villages in West Yorkshire
Kirkburton